Zahasmi Bin Ismail (born 9 November 1961) is a Malaysian former footballer and currently the head coach of Malaysia Premier League side, Kelantan United.

Career as a player
Zahasmi began his football career in 1986 playing for his hometown team, Kelantan FA. He mainly played as a central defender. He spent playing for the team until 1994 before he signed for a two-year contract with Terengganu FA in 1995 and 1996. Known as a strong, tenacious, commanding and physical defender, Zahasmi was known for his aggressive tackling, positioning, leadership and his ability to read the game, he is considered to be one of the best central defenders of his generation and labeled as 'The Tank'. Zahasmi return to Kelantan in 1997 and played for 3 seasons for the team before playing for JKR Kelantan in 2000. He retired as a footballer in 2004 last played for, JKR Kelantan.

Controversial issues
On 18 June 1994, Zahasmi was involved with an incident after assaulting Selangor FA forward, Zsolt Bücs, during the Premier League match held in Merdeka Stadium. He later was banned from playing for 6-months after being found guilty in the incident.

Coaching career
Zahasmi coaching career started in 2011 as head coach for Kelantan's youth team. He has brought the team to become King's Gold Cup champion and Malaysian President's Cup champion in 2011. Later in 2012, he was then appointed as assistant coach of Kelantan FA senior team with Bojan Hodak as head coach.

On 20 December 2015, he was appointed as head coach of Malaysia third tier league club, MOF F.C. playing for Malaysia FAM League. MOF finished second in the Group B league table.

On 30 November 2016, Zahasmi was appointed the successor of Velizar Popov at Kelantan FA becoming new head coach for 2017 season. His experience with Kelantan football in being crucial in making him the new head coach for the team. He also took over as the interim head coach of the club in 2015 when Azraai Khor left the head coach position.

Managerial statistics

References 

1967 births
Living people
People from Kelantan
Malaysian footballers
Malaysian football managers
Malaysian people of Malay descent
Association football central defenders